Aldo Zadrima (born January 15, 1948) is a chess player. In July 1994 Zadrima won the Albanian Chess Championship tournament to become the national champion.

External links

1948 births
Living people
Albanian chess players
Sportspeople from Tirana